Clara Calamai (7 September 1909 – 21 September 1998) was an Italian actress.

Career
Calamai's first acting role was in the 1938 war film  Pietro Micca, directed by Aldo Vergano.

In Alessandro Blasetti's The Jester's Supper (1942), Calamai briefly appeared topless in a scene. The scene is commonly credited with being the first time that an actress had appeared topless in an Italian sound film, although Vittoria Carpi showed a bare breast for a moment in the 1941 film La corona di ferro (The Iron Crown), which was also directed by Blasetti. Calamai stated in a later interview that the original script did not have the character revealing herself this way and did not want to do the scene, but felt compelled by the director to do it and gave in when she was promised a closed set. Nevertheless, many people reportedly saw the film many times because of the topless scene.

Her most remembered role was in the film Luchino Visconti's Ossessione (1943), in which she played Giovanna, the ill-fated female protagonist.

Calamai was offered the role in L'adultera (The Adulteress, 1946, directed by Duilio Coletti), after Anna Magnani had to turn it down. Calamai was awarded the Nastro d'Argento (Silver Ribbon) in 1946 for best actress for her performance in the film.

She played a prostitute in Luchino Visconti's Le notti bianche (1957) and appeared in Le streghe (1967).

After years of retirement, she returned in 1975 to appear in the  horror film Profondo rosso (Deep Red, directed by  Dario Argento) as the eccentric matriarch, Marta.

Personal life

On 19 May 1945 she married explorer, and documentary film maker Count Leonardo Bonzi with whom she had two daughters. The marriage was annulled in November 1959, and she lived with Captain of Aviation Valerio Andreoni. Calamai died of a stroke in Rimini on 21 September 1998.

Partial filmography 

Pietro Micca (1938, directed by Aldo Vergano) - La contessa de Lassere
Il destino in tasca (1938, directed by Gennaro Righelli)
They've Kidnapped a Man (1938, directed by Gennaro Righelli)
Ettore Fieramosca (1938, directed by Alessandro Blasetti) - Fulvia
I, His Father (1939, directed by Mario Bonnard) - Renata
The Fornaretto of Venice (1939, directed by Duilio Coletti) (doppiata da Tina Lattanzi) - Olimpia Zeno
L'eredità in corsa (1939, directed by Oreste Biancoli) - Lilli
The Silent Partner (1939, directed by Roberto Roberti) - La moglie di Prado
Le sorprese del vagone letto (1940, directed by Gian Paolo Rosmino) - La canzonettista
Boccaccio (1940, directed by Marcello Albani) - Giannina, falso Boccaccio
Captain Fracasse (1940, directed by Duilio Coletti) (doppiata da Tina Lattanzi) - Iolanda De Foix
Goodbye Youth (1940, directed by Ferdinando Maria Poggioli) - Elena
Manovre d'amore (1940, directed by Gennaro Righelli) - Agnese, l'istitutrice
Caravaggio (1941, directed by Goffredo Alessandrini) - Madonna Giaconella
Il re del circo (1941, directed by Hans Hinrich) - Bianca
I mariti - Tempesta d'amore (1941, directed by Camillo Mastrocinque) - Clara Ferri
Light in the Darkness (1941, directed by Mario Mattoli) - Amelia Gioiosi
Brivido (1941, directed by Giacomo Gentilomo) - Federica Usticky
Pirates of Malaya (1941, directed by Enrico Guazzoni) - Ada
The Adventuress from the Floor Above (1941, directed by Raffaello Matarazzo) - Biancamaria Rossi
The Jester's Supper (1942, directed by Alessandro Blasetti) - Ginevra
The Queen of Navarre (1942, directed by Carmine Gallone) - Isabella del Portogallo
La guardia del corpo (1942, directed by Carlo Ludovico Bragaglia) - Adriana
Le vie del cuore (1942, directed by Camillo Mastrocinque) - La baronessa Emilia Carpineti
Ossessione (1943, directed by Luchino Visconti) - Giovanna Bragana
Enrico IV (1943, directed by Giorgio Pàstina) - Matilde Spina / Frida
A Little Wife (1943, directed by Giorgio Bianchi) - Isa
 Farewell Love! (1943, directed by Gianni Franciolini) - Laura Acquaviva
The Materassi Sisters (1944, directed by Ferdinando Maria Poggioli) - Peggy
La resa di Titì (1945, directed by Giorgio Bianchi) - Paola De Marchi
Due lettere anonime (1945, directed by Mario Camerini) - Gina
The Adulteress (1946, directed by Duilio Coletti) - Velca
The Tyrant of Padua (1946, directed by Max Neufeld) - Tisbe
Il mondo vuole così (1946, directed by Giorgio Bianchi) - Carla
Last Love (1947, directed by Luigi Chiarini) - Maria, la canzonetista
When the Angels Sleep (1947, directed by Gilberto Gascon) - Elena
 Prelude to Madness (1948, directed by Gianni Franciolini (doppiata da Lydia Simoneschi) - Elena Leonardi
Romanticismo (1949, directed by Clemente Fracassi) - Giuditta Ansperti
Sicilian Uprising (1949, directed by Giorgio Pàstina) - Elena Di Caltabellotta
 The Phantom Musketeer (1952, directed by Max Calandri) - Marina Venier
Carne inquieta (1952, directed by Silvestro Prestifilippo) - Marchesa di Francavilla
Le notti bianche (1957, directed by Luchino Visconti) - La prostituta
Afrodite, dea dell'amore (1958, directed by Mario Bonnard) - Stenele
Tom Jones (1960, TV Mini-Series)
Le streghe (1967, directed by Luchino Visconti) - Ex-actress (segment "Strega Bruciata Viva, La")
Profondo rosso (1975, directed by Dario Argento) - Marta
La peccatrice (1975, directed by Pier Luigi Pavoni) - Michele's Mother (final film role)

References

External links

1909 births
1998 deaths
Nastro d'Argento winners
People from Prato
20th-century Italian actresses